Ghoraghata railway station is a station of the South Eastern Railway of India. It is located in Uluberia subdivision in the Howrah district in the Indian state West Bengal. It is located between Howrah and Kharagpur on the South Eastern Railway, approximately 49 kilometers from the Howrah station. This railway halt is located between the stations Bagnan and Deulti. This place and its surroundings are called as Ghoraghata Town. This area includes the areas of Durlavpur, Ghoraghata, Brindabanpur, Pipulyan, Kantapukur, Nabasan and Barunda. This station is located at a town called Barunda in the record of  Bagnan II CD Block as of the Census of India, 2011.

Geography

It is situated about 3 kilometers away from the bank of the Rupnarayan River. The main road passing through the heart of the town is Station Road, commonly referred to as the "baadh" (a kind of breakwater created to protect the villages from floods). It is also connected to National Highway 6, called the Bombay Road. This is an unplanned town.

"Ghoraghata" refers to the railway station, including the surrounding localities. It includes wholly or partially a number of localities surrounding the railway station, such as Brindabanpur (Ghoraghata itself is sometimes referred to by this name for postal and electoral requirements), Durlluvpur, Nabasan, Pipulan, Kantapukur, and Madari.

History
The Ghoraghata railway station was inaugurated in 1972.
The name Ghoraghata came from the Bengali words 'ghora' (horse) and 'ghat' (river crossing). During British rule, horses used to be stationed at the Rupnarayan river crossing.

Demographics
As of the 2001 Indian census, Ghoraghata has a population of around 9000. Males constitute 52% of the population and females 48%. Ghoraghata has an average literacy rate of 64%, higher than the national average of 59.5%: male literacy is 70%, and female literacy is 58%. In Ghoraghata, 15% of the population is under 6 years of age.

Hindus and Muslims together form about 99% of the population.

References

Railway stations in Howrah district
Kolkata Suburban Railway stations
Cities and towns in Howrah district